Webster Pass, elevation , is a mountain pass that crosses the Continental Divide in the Front Range of the Rocky Mountains of Colorado in the United States.  Originally known as Handcart Pass, the name changed in the 1870s after the Webster brothers constructed a toll road.

See also

Colorado mountain passes

References

Landforms of Park County, Colorado
Landforms of Summit County, Colorado
Mountain passes of Colorado
Great Divide of North America